The 1985 Individual Speedway Junior European Championship was the ninth edition of the European motorcycle speedway Under-21 Championships. It was won by Per Jonsson on July 14, 1985.

European final
July 14, 1985
 Abensberg, Motorstadion

References

1985
Individual Speedway Junior
Individual Speedway Junior
Speedway competitions in Germany
Individual Speedway Junior